Showbox is an online video streaming platform that enables users to stream and download many videos, commonly movies and TV shows for free.

Technology 
Showbox's video creation technology includes an online green screen feature, proprietary computer vision algorithms, deep learning technology to support the automatic creation of videos in the cloud, and advanced video compositing including special effects.

History 
The company opened the platform's to users that registered to its beta in late 2015.

In February 2016, the platform was officially launched, enabling any visitor to sign up and create videos online.

In April 2016, Showbox was featured on the Product Hunt website, coming to the top of the website's lists for that day and week with over 1400 upvotes by the Product Hunt community.

Also in April 2016, Showbox partnered with YouTube's leading Multi-Channel Networks including Fullscreen, BroadbandTV, StyleHaul, AwesomenessTV, and BuzzMyVideos in order to enable their communities of creators to access the platform.

In June 2016, the company launched Showbox For Brands, a business-oriented video creation platform, enabling companies to create video content in-house, and with their communities and influencers.

In March 2017, the company launched Showbox Engage, a use case of its B2B product launched in 2016, enabling companies to launch user-generated content campaigns with their communities

In April 2017, Showbox  and the United Nations announced a partnership around the 70th anniversary of the declaration of human rights, with an annual, ongoing global campaign in 135 languages, inviting people worldwide to create their part of the declaration in a video, from anywhere around the world.
In November 2017 Showbox partnered with the Ad:tech and Digital Marketing World Forum conferences (DMWF) in New York to provide their users and communities with a User Generated Content video solution.

Investors 
Showbox has raised over $15 million to date. All of the capital was raised from private Angels, most of whom are media executives such as Charles Petruccelli, the former president of American Express Global Business Travel; Brad Wechsler, chairman of IMAX; Wix co-founder and chief technology officer Giora Kaplan; and TPG Capital senior partner Karl Peterson.

Coverage and awards 
In March 2015, Showbox was nominated as one of the 10 Israeli startups to take over our TV screens this year.

In July 2016 Showbox won the Publicis90 award, as part of Publicis' "global initiative to foster digital entrepreneurship".

In March 2017 Showbox was chosen as one of The Culture Trip's 10 startups to watch for in 2017.

References

External links 

 Snaptik references

Video editing software
Marketing companies established in 2013
Internet properties established in 2013